Dato' Lee Hwa Beng is a Malaysian politician and the former Selangor State Assemblyman for Subang Jaya for three terms from 1995 to 2008. He is an accountant by training and served as Port Klang Authority chairman from 2008 to 2011.

Lee is a member of the Malaysian Chinese Association (MCA), a major component party of the ruling Barisan Nasional (BN) coalition. He first contested in 1990 general election, running for the Damansara Utama state seat. He lost but went on to win the Subang Jaya state seat for three terms in 1995, 1999 and 2004 general elections. In the 2008 general elections, Lee contested the parliamentary seat of Kelana Jaya, but lost out to Parti Keadilan Rakyat (PKR) newcomer Loh Gwo Burne.  Following his defeat, Lee was appointed Port Klang Authority chairman by Transport Minister Ong Tee Keat amid a cloud of controversy over the Port Klang Free Zone scandal. He wrote the book “PKFZ:A Nation’s Trust Betrayed.”
He was sacked by MCA in 2012 for investigating & exposing the PKFZ Fiasco.
To date he has not joined any political party

Election results

Honours
  :
  Knight Companion of the Order of Sultan Salahuddin Abdul Aziz Shah (DSSA) - Dato' (1999)

References

External links
 Lee Hwa Beng at Facebook

Living people
Malaysian people of Chinese descent
Malaysian Chinese Association politicians
Members of the Selangor State Legislative Assembly
Year of birth missing (living people)